Locust Grove is an unincorporated community in Mahoning County, Ohio, United States.

References

Unincorporated communities in Mahoning County, Ohio
Unincorporated communities in Ohio